Estonia–Mexico relations are the diplomatic relations between Estonia and Mexico. Both nations are members of the Organisation for Economic Co-operation and Development and the United Nations.

History

Estonia and Mexico  established diplomatic relations on 28 January 1937 in New York City. On 3 January 1938, a Friendship Agreement between the two nations took effect. During World War II, Estonia was occupied by both Nazi Germany and the Soviet Union in 1941. After the war, Estonia was forcibly annexed by the Soviet Union in September 1944. Mexico was one of the few countries that did not recognize the Soviet annexation of Estonia.

In August 1991, Estonia obtained its independence after the Dissolution of the Soviet Union. Mexico soon recognized the independence of Estonia on 5 September 1991 and re-established diplomatic relations with the country on 5 December 1991. Since then, Mexico has been accredited to Estonia from its embassy in Helsinki, Finland and Estonia has been accredited to Mexico from its embassy in Washington, D.C., United States.

In October 1995, both nations signed a Technology related co-operation agreement and an agreement on culture, education and sports was signed in 2005. In May 2004, Estonian Prime Minister Juhan Parts attended the Latin America, the Caribbean and the European Union Summit held in Guadalajara. In October 2012, Estonian Foreign Minister Urmas Paet paid a visit to Mexico and met with his counterpart Patricia Espinosa Cantellano. During their meeting, both nations signed an agreement on the avoidance of double taxation and tax evasion.

In 2018, Mexican graffiti artists donated 30 murals for Estonia's centenary. The event was known as Mextonia. 

In October 2021, the Director General for Europe, Bernardo Aguilar Calvo, paid a visit to Tallinn and led the Mexican delegation at the VI meeting of the Mechanism for Political Consultations between Mexico and Estonia. Within the framework of this meeting, both countries reviewed the progress in the bilateral relationship and exchanged points of view on regional issues.

High-level visits
High-level visits from Estonia to Mexico

 Prime Minister Juhan Parts (2004)
 Foreign Minister Urmas Paet (2012)
 Foreign Undersecretary Väino Reinart (2015)

High-level visits from Mexico to Estonia

 Foreign Undersecretary Lourdes Aranda (2005)
 Foreign Undersecretary Carlos de Icaza González (2014)
 Director General for Europe Bernardo Aguilar Calvo (2021)

Bilateral agreements
Both nations have signed a few bilateral agreements such as an Agreement on Technical Cooperation (1995); Agreement on Educational, Cultural and Sports Cooperation (2005) and an Agreement on the Avoidance of Double Taxation and Tax Evasion (2012).

Trade
In 1997, Mexico signed a Free Trade Agreement with the European Union (which includes Estonia). In 2018, trade between Estonia and Mexico totaled US$174 million. Estonia's main exports to Mexico include: machinery and equipment, transportation vehicles and mineral products. Mexico's main exports to Estonia include: prepared food and drinks, machinery and equipment and rubber and rubber products. In 2006, Estonian maritime company CF&S expanded to Mexico to offer logistical support to transfer goods from Mexico to Colombia and the Dominican Republic. Furthermore, in 2009 Mexican cement company Cemex joined with a Latvian ready-mix concrete producer Sakret to expand into the Estonian cement and ready-mix concrete market. In 2012, Mexico was Estonia's 27th largest trading partner.

Diplomatic missions 
 Estonia is accredited to Mexico from its embassy in Washington, D.C., United States and maintains honorary consulates in Mexico City and in Tampico.
 Mexico is accredited to Estonia from its embassy in Helsinki, Finland and maintains an honorary consulate in Tallinn.

See also 
 Foreign relations of Estonia 
 Foreign relations of Mexico

References

 
Mexico 
Bilateral relations of Mexico